Babumoshai Bandookbaaz is a 2017 Indian Hindi-language action thriller film directed by Kushan Nandy and produced by Kiran Shyam Shroff and Ashmith Kunder. The film features Nawazuddin Siddiqui and Bidita Bag in the lead roles. The movie did average business at the box office.

Plot 
 
The story is set in the heartland of Uttar Pradesh, whose political landscape is dominated by two politicians Dubey & Jiji. Babu Bihari is a hitman hired by both to get rid of their rivals. He kills for a paltry sum of  20,000, of which  5000 for the constable who gets him the hit job. Babu is ferocious & has a straightforward approach to hitting his target. He has a reputation for clean hits without any fuss.

Babu leads a very simple life, lives alone in a shanty in a remote location. One fine day Jiji offers him a hit job of a local muscleman. Babu goes to survey the routine of his target. There he comes across Phulwa, a cobbler. He is smitten by her beauty and impressed with her headstrong attitude. He tries to court her, but his advances are rejected. Meanwhile, he kills his target, which is witnessed by Phulwa.

In the police investigation, she refuses to identify him. Babu barges into her home, and she stabs him instinctively with a sharp tool. Babu somehow manages to control the damage and tells her that he came because he was curious about not divulging any information to the police. She tells him that the guy he just killed and his two brothers raped her repeatedly. She tells him if he kills the rest of the two brothers, she would spend her entire life with him. Babu promptly kills the two remaining brothers.

When he returns for his payment Jiji is furious with him. As he has ruined her plan. It was on the insistence of the younger brother, that she killed the elder brother to forge an alliance with the remaining two brothers for upcoming elections. This puts Babu in bad books with Jiji.

Here Babu & Fulwa have a great time and enjoy each other's company. On the other hand, Dubey feels that the three men of Jiji are an obstacle to his prospects of winning the election. He gives the contract to kill all to Babu. Babu goes to Jiji & informs her about the contract. He throws an open challenge to her to save her men if she can. He is about to hit his first kill when a bullet is already shot, missing its target. In the ensuing chaos, the victim escapes. It turns out that there is another hitman given the same contract. Babu saves the second hitman from the enraged mob. The second hitman is Banke, who considers Babu as his guru. Although furious at first that he ruined his kill, Babu makes amends with Banke. They decide to make this as a game. Of the three kills, whoever scores higher will win & the loser will have to leave the profession.

Babu scores the first kill. He is about to score the second hit, but a cop loyal to Jiji intervenes. In the ensuing scuffle, Babu is hit in the shoulder. He takes him in his police jeep and is just about to depart, when Banke sneaks in as a postman and scores the kill. The cop is furious takes him to a jungle to investigate. Babu is rescued by Banke and takes him to his home. Phulwa removes the bullet from his body & heals him back to health. She is impressed by his suave looks & muscular physique. A chemistry seems to boil between the two, which Babu also notices. Babu offers them to spend a night together. Shocked at first, Phulwa berates him & walks away. Banke reluctantly backtracks, saying that he was going along with their dance & booze filled merriment. On hearing, this Babu tells Banke that he was actually testing their integrity & if they had tried spending the night together, he would have killed both of them.

After recovering from his injury Babu and Banke collaborate to kill Triloki, the last target & closest aide of Jiji. They create a chaos in the rally & abduct him from there in the guise of constables. After killing him, they sit near a railway bridge to celebrate their victory. After moments of drunken banter, Banke reveals that the contract was for four people & shoots Babu point blank. Babu falls off the bridge into a cargo train.

Next, we see Babu waking up in a hospital with long hair & a beard, apparently from a long coma. He clean-up himself & returns. His cop friend reveals that after the death of Triloki, Jiji got her entire force to his location, set his house on fire, raped & burnt Phulwa as well. Babu is completely heartbroken & swears vengeance for the blood of all the traitors. The first locates Banke & just as he is about to kill him, Banke explains that he just executed his contract, principally Babu respect that. He spares his life because Banke had saved his life in the past. Banke tells him that Dubey revealed his address to Jiji. Thereafter he goes on a killing spree & kills all his nemesis.

In the end, the secretary of Dubey (who now owns his empire) gives Babu one more contract. Babu refuses & says that he has left the business. He gives him an address & tells him that he has a strong motive to take this contract.

Babu goes to the address & instinctively avoids getting stabbed from a sharp tool, unmistakenly from Phulwa. He is surprised to see her alive, and she also has his son. Then comes Banke. It is then revealed that Banke & Phulwa fell in love the moment they met. Phulwa gives Banke the contract to kill Babu. Babu kills Banke by tricking him into a Russian roulette styled game. He kills Phulwa as well for her betrayal and burns both of them on a pyre, and keeps the child. In the end, we see babu raising the child after pledging away from crime. One day while going through the notebook of the child, he finds that the child has drawn a picture of a family in it (mom, dad and child). While looking at the picture, his eyes suddenly widen in surprise as he sees the same child approaching him with a gun held up. In the end, a shot is heard with the words "What goes around comes around".

Cast 
 Nawazuddin Siddiqui as Babu Bihari
 Bidita Bag as Phulwa
 Jatin Goswami as Banke Bihari
 Shraddha Das as Jasmine
 Anil George as Dubey Ji
 Bhagwan Tiwari
 Jeetu Shivhare
 Murali Sharma as Triloki
 Divya Dutta as Jiji
 Sachin Chaubey
 Mahesh Chandra Deva as phoolchand Mla candidate 
 Rakesh Dubey as a massager
 Jeetu  as Groom's Father

Production

Casting and development 
Nawazuddin Siddiqui as Babu plays the role of a sharp shooter for which he took special lessons in handling guns and action. Prague based cinematographer Vishal Vittal was signed in for the film and added an international look to the rustic landscape of Uttar Pradesh while the crisp dialogues of Ghalib Asad Bhopali (son of famous lyricist Asad Bhopali) adds humour and spark to the desi flavour and dialect. A special dialect coach was engaged at the shoot to capture the inherent flavour. Detailed research was done for costumes and sets to give an authentic look. All the songs were choreographed by Jeet Singh.

Filming 
Principal photography of the film's first schedule began in, June 2016, in Uttar Pradesh. The first schedule was completed in July 2016. The film shooting was wrapped up in January 2017 and is due to release in 25 June 2017. The film is made in only 5 crore Indian rupees including print and advertisement.

Soundtrack 

The soundtrack was released on 18 August 2017.

Release 
The film was released in India on 25 August 2017 in 1,200 cinemas.

Critical response 
, Babumoshai Bandookbaaz holds a 44% approval rating, on review aggregator website Rotten Tomatoes, based on nine reviews with an average rating of 4.5 out of 10. Rajeev Masand of News18 gave the film a rating of 2.5 out of 5 and said that, "It's a guilty pleasure at best, provocative and titillating. But it's also overlong and derivative, and gives one of our finest actors little room to do much more than repeat himself." Rohit Vats of Hindustan Times gave the film a rating of 2.5 out of 5 and said that, "Babumoshai Bandookbaaz appears superficial because it fails to explore characters and their idiosyncrasies. It's a film pretending to be a stylishly raw gangster saga originated in the interiors of the Hindi heartland, but in reality, it's nothing more than another attempt to look at the crime prone lower strata of society; through a rose tinted glass." Meena Iyer of The Times of India gave the film a rating of 3 out of 5 saying that, "The screenplay could have definitely been tighter. Yet Kushan Nandy gives you a film that you find yourself compulsively watching." Namrata Joshi of The Hindu praised the performances of Nawazuddin Siddiqui, Jatin Gandhi and Bhagwan Tiwari and concluded her review saying that the film is, "Yet another revenge drama set in UP badlands that lacks cohesion despite some strong performances." Saibal Chatterjee of NDTV gave the film a rating of 1.5 out of 5 and said that, "As capricious as its unfounded title, Kushan Nandy's rough-hewn hinterland noir Babumoshai Bandookbaaz is a roaring mess. It misfires on most counts." Shubhra Gupta of The Indian Express gave the film a rating of 2 out of 5 and said that the film has interesting characters. Still, the story has nothing new to offer. Udita Jhunjhunwala of Live Mint criticized the film, saying that "Kushan Nandy's Babumoshai Bandookbaaz is a low-calorie version of Gangs of Wasseypur" in which "Nawazuddin Siddiqui reprises the sort of character audiences have already seen him perfect."

References

External links 
 
 
 

2017 films
Indian action thriller films
2017 crime action films
2017 action thriller films
Indian gangster films
Indian crime action films
Films set in Uttar Pradesh
2010s Hindi-language films
Films shot in Kolkata
Films shot in Lucknow
Films about contract killing in India